Gunnar Fatland (born 9 November 1946 in Kvinnherad) is a Norwegian politician for the Conservative Party.

He was elected to the Norwegian Parliament from Rogaland in 1985, and was re-elected on two occasions.

On the local level Fatland was mayor of Strand during the term 1979–1983, and then became a member of the executive committee of Strand municipality council from 1983 to 1987. From 1983 to 1987 he was also a deputy member of Rogaland county council.

Outside politics he mainly worked as a banker. He was a member of various public boards and committees, and of the local sports club in Tau.

References

1946 births
Living people
People from Kvinnherad
Conservative Party (Norway) politicians
Members of the Storting
Mayors of places in Rogaland
Norwegian bankers
20th-century Norwegian politicians